Valmiro Lopes Rocha (born 23 April 1981), known as Valdo, is a Cape Verdean professional footballer who plays for the Spanish club CD Izarra mainly as a winger.

He has played for several clubs in La Liga during his professional career, notably Osasuna, Espanyol and Levante. Over 12 seasons in the competition, he appeared in 258 matches and scored 34 goals.

Early years
Valdo was born in Villablino, León, in the region of Laciana, where his parents had moved after migrating from Cape Verde to work in the coal mines.

He started playing football with the amateur side CF Pozuelo de Alarcón in Madrid and stayed there for the following seven years.

Club career

Real Madrid / Osasuna
In 2001, Real Madrid signed him for its reserve teams. He played in 2001–02 with Real Madrid Castilla and, also during that season, received first-team opportunities in La Liga, the Copa del Rey and the UEFA Champions League, with the Merengues eventually winning the latter competition.

In January 2003, Valdo moved to the league club CA Osasuna, first on loan, where he developed as a top division player, scoring five goals in 35 games in his first full season. On 11 April 2004, he scored in a 3–0 away win against his former club.

In the 2005–06 season, although he featured much less mainly due to a groin ailment, Valdo scored in a 2–1 home victory over FC Barcelona on 12 March 2006, as Osasuna qualified for the first time for the Champions League qualifying rounds. After the demotion to the UEFA Cup, he helped the team reach the last-four against Sevilla FC, scoring twice in ten matches.

Espanyol
RCD Espanyol signed Valdo at the end of 2006–07 to a four-year deal. He played his first game for the Barcelona-based side against CF Peralada during the pre-season.

On 14 July 2009, after having appeared sparingly, Valdo moved to Málaga CF in a season-long loan. After being dropped from the squad for several months due to his bad performances, he was brought back on 27 February 2010; he scored his first goal for the club against Barcelona on the same day, but Málaga lost 1–2 away at Camp Nou.

Levante
On 13 August 2010, Valdo left Espanyol and signed with Levante UD, reuniting with his Málaga teammates Gustavo Munúa and Xavi Torres. He contributed heavily during his first season – 2,119 minutes, 25 starts – as Levante retained their top-flight status, scoring against Getafe CF in a 2–0 home win and Villarreal CF for a 1–0 away victory.

Valdo was even more important in 2011–12 and scored on six occasions as Levante qualified for the Europa League for the first time ever after finishing sixth. Two of those goals near the end of the season, in home defeats of Atlético Madrid (2–0) and Granada CF (3–1).

Later career
After leaving Levante, Valdo rarely settled with a club, playing in quick succession with Asteras Tripoli in Greece, Racing de Santander of Spain and Atlético de Kolkata of the Indian Super League. On 1 September 2016, he returned to Spain to sign for CD Lealtad.

International career
Valdo played for the Spanish under-21s in the early 2000s. In late August 2011, aged 30, he was called up by the Cape Verde national team for a match against Mali on 3 September, for the 2012 Africa Cup of Nations qualificatiers, and made his debut in the 0–3 away loss.

Career statistics

Club

International goals

References

External links

1981 births
Living people
Sportspeople from the Province of León
Spanish sportspeople of African descent
Spanish people of Cape Verdean descent
Citizens of Cape Verde through descent
Spanish footballers
Cape Verdean footballers
Footballers from Castile and León
Association football wingers
La Liga players
Segunda División players
Segunda División B players
Tercera División players
Real Madrid Castilla footballers
Real Madrid CF players
CA Osasuna players
RCD Espanyol footballers
Málaga CF players
Levante UD footballers
Racing de Santander players
CD Lealtad players
CD Izarra footballers
Liga MX players
Atlante F.C. footballers
Super League Greece players
Asteras Tripolis F.C. players
Indian Super League players
ATK (football club) players
UEFA Champions League winning players
Spain under-21 international footballers
Cape Verde international footballers
Spanish expatriate footballers
Cape Verdean expatriate footballers
Expatriate footballers in Mexico
Expatriate footballers in Greece
Expatriate footballers in India
Spanish expatriate sportspeople in Mexico
Spanish expatriate sportspeople in Greece
Spanish expatriate sportspeople in India
Peña Sport FC footballers